Orem is a city in Utah County, Utah, United States, in the northern part of the state.

Orem is one of the principal cities of the Provo-Orem, Utah Metropolitan Statistical Area, which includes all of Utah and Juab counties. The 2020 population was 98,129, while the 2010 population was 88,328 making it the fifth-largest city in Utah. Utah Valley University is located in Orem.

History 
At one time the area was known as Sharon, a Biblical name for a mostly level strip of land running between mountains and the sea, and the name of the Vermont birth town of Joseph Smith, founder of the Latter Day Saint movement. Another former name was Provo Bench. In an apparent attempt to attract more investment to the town and provide an easy way for the large population of farmers with orchards to ship produce, in 1914 it was named after Walter C. Orem, President of the Salt Lake and Utah Railroad in the early 1900s.  Orem was incorporated on May 5, 1919.

Arts and culture
Orem is renowned for the Timpanogos Storytelling Festival, and its Summerfest celebration and parade in June is a popular local attraction.

Geography
Orem is located at  (40.298753, -111.696486). Situated in a high desert, with an average elevation of 4,756 feet. The City is located near the eastern shore of Utah Lake, bordering Provo on the east and south, Vineyard to the west, Lindon contiguous to the north, and Mount Timpanogos/Wasatch Mountain range to the east.

Demographics

As of 2011 the 88,112 residents of Orem had a racial and ethnic composition of 89.3% white, 0.9% black or African American, 0.9% Native American, 1.6% Asian, 0.5% Pacific Islanders, 4% non-Hispanics reporting some other race, 2.9% two or more races reported and 14.8% Hispanic, as Orem has a large Mexican American community with other Latinos residing in the city. This contrasts with the census of 2000, which showed a racial makeup of 90.80% White, 0.33% African American, 0.73% Native American, 1.45% Asian, 0.86% Pacific Islander, 3.64% from other races, and 2.18% from two or more races. Hispanic or Latino of any race were 8.56% of the population.

The 2000 Census counted 84,324 people, 23,382 households, and 19,079 families. The population density at that time was 4,572.6 people per square mile (1,765.6/km2). There were 24,166 housing units at an average density of 1,310.4 per square mile (506.0/km2). 
There were 23,382 households, out of which 48.8% had children under the age of 18 living with them, 69.0% were married couples living together, 9.5% had a female householder with no husband present, and 18.4% were non-families. 12.4% of all households were made up of individuals, and 5.1% had someone living alone who was 65 years of age or older. The average household size was 3.57 and the average family size was 3.93.

In the city, the population was spread out, with 35.4% under the age of 18, 17.4% from 18 to 24, 25.8% from 25 to 44, 14.5% from 45 to 64, and 6.9% who were 65 years of age or older. The median age was 24 years. For every 100 females, there were 98.7 males. For every 100 females age 18 and over, there were 95.2 males.

The median income for a household in the city was $52,703, and the median income for a family was $59,066. Males had a median income of $42,249 versus $30,742 for females. The per capita income for the city was $20,971. About 10.3% of families and 13.8% of the population were below the poverty line, including 16% of those under age 18 and 6% of those age 65 or over.

As of 2002, over 97% of all church-going citizens of Orem are members of the Church of Jesus Christ of Latter-day Saints. Due to the high numbers of Latter-day Saints in the area, Church President Russell M. Nelson announced a temple in Orem on October 5, 2019. The temple will be located a half mile south of the Interstate 15 exit at University Parkway on South Geneva Road.

Education
Orem is located in the Alpine School District and is home to three high schools, three junior high schools, and 14 elementary schools. Stevens-Henager College is also located in Orem, as is an education center of Utah State University.

Utah Valley University

Utah Valley University is a public university operated by the state of Utah. UVU is one of the United States' only Open Enrollment Universities offering  acceptance to all applicants. As a university, UVU offers a wide variety of bachelor's and master's degrees. UVU is the largest and fastest growing public university in Utah with its attendance of over 34,000 undergraduates.  The campus's notable features include the UCCU Center, the Digital Learning Center library, the Hal Wing Track and Field Complex, and the Woodbury School of Business. The Roots of Knowledge stained glass display is located in the Fulton Library on campus.

Government
The city of Orem is governed by a council-manager system. The mayor and council members are elected and serve part-time, while the city manager is appointed and serves full-time. There are six city council members that serve alongside the mayor. The mayor and city council are elected to four year terms.

List of mayors of Orem (years served):
B. M. Jolley (1941-1945)
J. W. Gillman (1946-1953)
Ray E. Loveless (1953)
Leland Jarman (1954-1957)
Luzell Robbins (1958)
V. Emil Hansen (1958-1959)
Melbourne D. Wallace (1960-1961)
G. Milton Jameson (1962-1965)
James E. Mangum (1966-1967)
Winston M. Crawford (1968-1973)
James E. Mangum (1974-1981)
Delance W. Squire (1982-1985)
S. Blaine Willes (1986-1991)
Joyce Johnson (1991)
Stella Welsh (1992-1997)
Joseph Nelson (died in office) (1998-1999)
Chris Yandow (1999-1999)
Jerry C. Washburn (2000-2011) Died on September 26, 2011 after a long battle with cancer.
James T. Evans (2011-2014)
Richard F. Brunst, Jr. (2014-2021)
David A. Young (2022-Current)

Economy

Orem has a wide variety of stores and businesses. Orem is also home to the oldest mall in Utah County, opened in March 1973.

Top employers
According to the City's 2019 Comprehensive Annual Financial Report, the top employers in the city are:

Company startups 
Several notable companies started in Orem:
Blendtec
Bluehost
Caldera
Fishbowl Inventory
Flexsim
Mity-Lite
Novell (now owned by Micro Focus)
Omniture (now owned by Adobe Systems)
PowerQuest
Wahoo Studios
NinjaBee, subdivision of Wahoo Studios
WordPerfect (now owned by Corel, was at one time, when first named Satellite Software International [SSI], headquartered in the basement of the Orem City offices)
Zuka Juice

Sports

Orem has been home to a number of professional sports teams in addition to being the home to Utah Valley University's Wolverines athletic teams. The Orem Owlz minor league baseball team, a rookie league affiliate of the Los Angeles Angels, began play in 2005. The Owlz won 5 championships and had more than 90 major league players as part of the team. The Owlz played their home games at UCCU Ballpark on the campus of Utah Valley University. The stadium has a capacity of 5,000 spectators. The Owlz competed in the Pioneer League against teams from Colorado, Idaho, Montana and one team in Utah - the Ogden Raptors. They relocated to Windsor, Colorado, in 2021 and became the Northern Colorado Owlz.

Orem has also been the home to two indoor football teams as well as a G League professional basketball team. In 1998, the Utah Catzz played their only season in the Professional Indoor Football League as the league only lasted one season. The Utah Flash was an NBA G League affiliate of the Philadelphia 76ers that was established in 2007.

Transportation

Public transit 

Several modes of transportation are available in Orem. The Utah Transit Authority operates the Frontrunner train, Utah Valley Express (UVX) bus rapid transit and regular bus service in the city. The Orem station serves Utah Transit Authority's FrontRunner train. The UVX route runs from Orem Central Station through UVU and along University Parkway through Orem's uptown near its southern boundary with Provo, which is where the opposite end of the bus line is located.

Major highways 

The road system includes an Interstate highway, US highways, state highways, and city-maintained roads. Interstate 15 runs through the west side of Orem with four interchanges in the city. US Highway 89 (State Street) runs northwest/southeast through the middle of the city, while US Highway 189 (University Avenue) passes through a short section of northeast Orem. There are also four state routes that pass through the city - SR-52 (800 North/Canyon Parkway), SR-114 (Geneva Road), SR-241 (1600 North), and SR-265 (University Parkway).

Notable people

 Alan Ashton - owns land of Thanksgiving Point and is co-founder of WordPerfect
 Ben Cahoon - receiver for the Montreal Alouettes
 William Campbell - California state legislator
 James C. Christensen - fantasy, religious and surrealism artist
 Ally Condie - New York Times bestselling author of the Matched series
 LaVell Edwards - BYU football coach
 Travis Hansen - former guard for Atlanta Hawks; co-founder of EddyHR
 Brett Helquist- illustrator of A Series of Unfortunate Events
 Gary Herbert - former Governor of the State of Utah
 Chelsie Hightower - So You Think You Can Dance season 4 finalist and professional ballroom dancer on Dancing with the Stars
 Allison Holker - So You Think You Can Dance season 2 finalist
 Julianne Hough - professional ballroom dancer on Dancing with the Stars and singer, born in Orem
 John S. K. Kauwe III - Biologist and president of Brigham Young University–Hawaii
 Paul Kruger - NFL linebacker for the Cleveland Browns
 Chad Lewis - NFL tight end
 Bert McCracken - lead vocals of the rock band The Used, was born in Provo but grew up in Orem
 Donny Osmond - American actor and singer
 Marie Osmond - American actress and singer
 Noelle Pikus-Pace - 2005 overall World Cup Skeleton title winner and Silver Medalist at 2014 Sochi Winter Olympics
 Shauna Rohbock - silver medalist in women's bobsleigh at the Turin 2006 Olympics
 Thomas Sederberg - Creator of the T-spline
 Howard Tayler - author of Schlock Mercenary
 Erin Thorn - WNBA guard
 Dan Wells - author of the I Am Not a Serial Killer and Partials book series
Notable groups include:
Rock band The Used
 The Aces (indie pop band)

City parks

Orem has more than 20 parks throughout the city. In 2017, the Orem Splash Pad opened at Palisade Park. The Splash Pad uses 1,000 gallons per minute and has a weave spray nozzle as well as 22 other spray nozzles. The Skate Park opened in 2002 and has a quarter acre of cemented space for extreme sport use. City Center Park is home to the annual Orem Summerfest as well as concerts and other cultural events. City parks include:

 Bonneville Park
 Cascade Park
 Cherry Hill Park
 City Center Park
 Community park
 Foothill Park
 Geneva Park
 Hillcrest Park
 Lakeside Sports Park
 Mt. Timpanogos Park
 Nielson's Grove Park
 Northridge Park
 Orchard Park
 Palisade Park
 Scera Park
 Sharon Park
 Skate Park
 Spring Water Park
 Westmore Park
 Windsor Park

Sister cities 
Orem has one sister city in  Ürümqi, China according to the Utah League of Cities and Towns and the Utah Sister Cities Coalition

See also
 Christeele Acres Historic District
 Cirque Lodge
 List of cities and towns in Utah

References

External links

 

 
Cities in Utah
Provo–Orem metropolitan area
Populated places established in 1877
Cities in Utah County, Utah
1877 establishments in Utah Territory